State Route 209  (SR 209) is a state route in the U.S. state of Maine. It runs from the intersection of Popham Road and Sea Street in the Phippsburg community of Popham Beach to an interchange with U.S. Route 1 (US 1) in Bath. The entire route is in Sagadahoc County. At its southern end, state maintenance of Popham Road continues past Sea Street to the entrance to Fort Popham.

Junction list

References

External links

Floodgap Roadgap's RoadsAroundME: Maine State Route 209

209
Transportation in Sagadahoc County, Maine